Sherburne may refer to:

People with the surname
 Edward Sherburne (1618–1702), English poet, translator, and Royalist
Henry Sherburne (1611–1680), early settler in Portsmouth, New Hampshire
Henry Sherburne (colonel) (1748-1824), officer in the Continental Army during the American Revolution
John C. Sherburne (1883-1959), attorney and judge from Vermont
John Samuel Sherburne (1757–1830), politician from New Hampshire
Moses Sherburne (1808–1868), jurist and politician from Maine and Minnesota

Places
 Sherburne, Kentucky, an unincorporated community
 Sherburne County, Minnesota, a county in the central part of the state
 Sherburne (town), New York, a town in Chenango County, and Sherburne (village), New York, a village therein
 Sherburne National Wildlife Refuge, Minnesota
 Lake Sherburne, Montana
 Killington, Vermont (formerly known as Sherburne), a ski resort town in Vermont

Other uses
 USS Sherburne (APA-205)
 A well-known melody from the Sacred Harp, to which the lyric, "While Shepherds Watched Their Flocks by Night", by Nahum Tate, may be sung

See also
Henry Sherburne House, ca, 1766-1770, in Portsmouth, New Hampshire
Sherburn (disambiguation)